The Kick Off franchise is a series of football simulation video games, In 1988 Dino Dini was hired to code a top down football game from a Steve Screech idea.  in 1989 Kick Off was then published by Anil Gupta's publishing house Anco Software for the Atari ST and Commodore Amiga. The original version was programmed by Dino Dini with graphics, playtesting and tuning by Steve Screech. First released in 1989, Kick Off was well-received and won awards.

After the release of Kick Off several sequels were released. Player Manager was released in 1990. The game was the first game to combine a management environment (including tactics, league play, transfers, and detailed player attributes) with a football game engine (based on that of Kick Off). Kick Off 2 was released in 1990 as a sequel to Kick Off. The game introduced a number of new features as well as several small alterations.

In 1992, Dino Dini left Anco and signed a contract for Virgin Games, which released Goal! in 1993. Anco released several further editions of the Kick Off series between 1994 and 1997, but these games had little in common with Kick Off and Kick Off 2. In 2001–2003, the KOA collaborated closely with Anco developer Steve Screech in an attempt to relaunch the Kick Off and Player Manager series. Kick Off 2002 was released. Anco started to work on another sequel Kick Off 2004 which reached beta status. The attempt came to a halt when Anco closed in 2003.

History
Kick Off was released in 1989. Kick Off was first developed for the Atari ST and then ported to the Amiga. Several expansion disks were released for Kick Off 2. In 1992, Dino Dini left Anco and signed a contract for Virgin Games, which released Goal! in 1993. Anco released Kick Off 3 in 1994. The game used a side view instead of a top-down view and bore little resemblance to Kick Off 2 apart from the name. Anco Software published the first versions of Kick Off for the Amiga and Atari ST.

Gameplay

With Kick Off the ball did not stick to the player's feet but instead was realistically kicked ahead from the players, in a manner similar to that of Nintendo's Soccer, released in 1985 on the NES. This added a degree of difficulty and skill requirement at the same time. Other attributes, such as action replays, players with different characteristics, different tactics, fouls, yellow cards, red cards, injuries, injury time and various referees with different moods also featured.

Reception

ST Action – Highest accolade they could give.
Amiga User Int – "Best computer game ever" 97%
The One – "Ultimate soccer simulation" 96%
ACE – "Brilliant, BUY BUY BUY" 92%
Amiga Format – "Best footy game to have appeared on any machine" 94%
ST Format – "What a game! gem to play. Magic" 90%
C&VG - "Championship winning material" 95%
The Games Machine – "Probably the best sports game ever" 92%
Commodore User – "No other footy game can touch it" 90%
Amiga Action – "Surpasses all other football games" 93%
PCW - "Nothing short of brilliant"
New Comp Express – "Computer football event of the year"
Zzap!64 – "So realistic, so fun, and soooo addictive" 96%

Awards
 Awarded UK. 1989 INDIN Best 16 Bit Product
 Nominated UK. 1989 INDIN Best Programmer (2nd place, the winner was "Bullfrog" for "Populous")
 Awarded 1989 EMAP Images Golden Joystick Award Best 16 Bit Product. (EMAP is a major UK magazine publisher).
 Voted the 7th best game of all time in Amiga Power.

Sequels

Player Manager

Kick Off 2
In 1990, Kick Off 2 was released by Anco. Kick Off 2 retains the pace and accuracy of Kick Off, with a full size multi directional scrolling pitch and the players, markings, goals etc., in correct proportions. Both teams play the game strictly according to tactics. Players move into position to receive passes and gain possession. The ball, as in real game, travels ahead of the player.

There is a league and a cup tournament with sudden death penalty shoot outs, in case of a draw. The teams in the league are on the whole evenly matched but with different styles of play and the player skills to match, that style. There is an option to load your own team from "Player Manager" along with your own tactics, to play against another "Player Manager" team in a single game or enter league and cup tournament.

The special events selection in the main menu allows data disks to be loaded. Kick Off 2 also provides the facility to change strip colours and on expanded Atari ST's (1 MB or above) there are additional sound effects. The "Action Replay" facility allows goals to be viewed at normal pace or in "Slow Motion" and saved to disk. There are 24 referees and have their own distinctive temperaments.

Super Kick Off
Super Kick Off is one of the follow-ups of Kick Off and Kick Off 2 for the Sega Master System, Game Boy, Sega Mega Drive and SNES. Super Kick Off was slower than the original games. The Mega Drive version knocked PGA Tour Golf II from the top of the charts. MegaTech gave the game 94% and a Hyper Game Award, saying that the "feel and playability is unrivalled by any other footy game so far", but criticising the high price of £45.

Goal!

In 1992, a sequel, Kick Off 3, was in development. The game wasn't released in this form though, as Dino Dini left Anco in 1992 for Virgin Games, where he developed Goal!, released in 1993. Goal! featured similar gameplay to Kick Off 2 but also added one-touch passing as seen in Sensible Soccer, player acceleration, and more advanced menu systems and options. Goal! received generally good reviews but did not enjoy the same lasting popularity as Kick Off 2.

Kick Off 3 
In 1994, Anco released Kick Off 3 developed by Steve Screech, a totally new game with nothing in common with Kick Off 2. The game didn't receive as good reviews as its predecessors and didn't gain the same popularity. An Atari Jaguar port was in development but never released.

Kick Off 96, 97 & 98
In 1996, Toka Nono released Kick Off 96 for Amiga and Windows. The game received average reviews. In 1997, Kick Off 97 was released for Windows. The game received better reviews than Kick Off 96 but still didn't become popular. Later the same year, Anco released Kick Off 98 for the PC which received poor reviews. In 1998 Kick Off World was released for the original PlayStation, again developed by Toka and published by Funsoft.

Kick Off 2002
In 2001, Steve Screech started a project called Ultimate Kick Off with the help of an early established Kick Off Association. The game was built using the Gamebryo engine, released by Anco in 2002 for PC  and Mac with the name Kick Off 2002. The game received poor reviews and only sold 5000 copies. Later a sequel called Kick Off 2004 was planned. It reached beta status but it was never released. The project ended when Anco closed in 2003.

Kick Off Revival
In the end of 2015, Dino Dini announced that he was working on a new entry in the series, with a control system designed for the use with an analog stick. Kick Off Revival was released on June 24, 2016 exclusively for PlayStation 4 with poor reviews from the main game websites,  A delayed PlayStation Vita version was released nine months later in 2017 with bad reviews. A PC version is available on Steam.

Games in the series
The Kick Off series includes the following games:

Games by Dino Dini

Kick Off (1989)
Kick Off 2 (1990)
Kick Off 2 1MB (1990)
Kick Off Revival (2016)
Goal.

Games by Steve Screech

 Kick Off 97 (1997)
 Kick Off 3 (1994)
 Kick Off 2002 (2002)

Expansion disks

Kick Off Extra Time (Data disk) (1989)
Kick Off 2: Giants of Europe (Data disk) (1990)
Kick Off 2: The Final Whistle (Expansion disk) (1991)
Kick Off 2: Return To Europe (Expansion disk) (1991)
Kick Off 2: Winning Tactics (Data disk) (1991)
Kick Off 2: Super League (Expansion disk) (1991) Games by others:
Franco Baresi World Cup Kick Off (1990)
Player Manager (1990)
Kick Off 2 World Cup 90 (1990)
Kick Off 2: Maths Disk (Expansion disk)  (1991)
Super Kick-Off (1991)
Kick Off 98 (1997)

Ports
 World League Soccer (Super NES)

References 

1989 video games
Amiga games
Amstrad CPC games
Association football video games
Atari 8-bit family games
Atari ST games
Cancelled Atari Jaguar games
Commodore 64 games
DOS games
Game Boy games
Gamebryo games
Golden Joystick Award winners
Imagineer games
Master System games
Multiplayer and single-player video games
Nintendo Entertainment System games
Sega Genesis games
Super Nintendo Entertainment System games
Tiertex Design Studios games
ZX Spectrum games
Video game franchises introduced in 1989
Video games scored by Barry Leitch
Golden Joystick Award for Game of the Year winners
Video games developed in the United Kingdom